Michele LeAnn Morgan (July 20, 1957 – August 11, 1961) was an American child abuse victim who was murdered by her stepmother at the age of four. Her story was documented on an episode of Cold Case Files.

Abuse
Michele suffered multiple injuries to the chest and back, a broken nose, burns on her skin, and a broken arm before the age of four at the hands of her stepmother, Mary Rae. These led to over 20 visits to a hospital, including one in which she was hospitalized for a month.

Murder
On August 9, 1961, Mary held Michele under water and stomped her violently, believing that the child had lied about something. These actions were seen by Michele's older brother, George. At dinner, Michele threw up blood clots. The next day she died of her internal injuries. An autopsy was conducted by the pathologist at Scott Air Force Base, Illinois, near where the Morgans lived and Michele's father, a USAF airman, was stationed, the cause of death was found to be massive trauma to the chest.

The autopsy report was not completed until 15 years later, when the coroner listed the cause of death as pneumonia. The local prosecutor never pursued the case.

Disclosure
In 1996, George Morgan (Michele's older brother) was serving time in prison for rape. That year, he decided to research his family genealogy and was surprised when he saw his sister's death certificate. He recalled the circumstances surrounding her death and was certain that it was not caused by pneumonia — and that it had occurred in 1961, not in 1976.

Morgan then corresponded with County Coroner Rick Stone and disclosed to him how Michele's death really occurred. Stone subsequently reopened the case and Michele's body was exhumed. Though the body had been buried for over 30 years, it still showed the marks of brutal child abuse. Investigators discovered the original autopsy report and Michele's hospital record, which showed multiple visits. George Morgan's claims were thus substantiated.

Prosecution

Mary Morgan was tracked down in West Columbia, Texas, and initially denied the allegations leveled against her. She then attempted to flee the country but was caught and placed under arrest. She eventually pleaded guilty to involuntary manslaughter and was sentenced to five years in prison and was released in 2001.

In the years after Michele's death, Mary raised four children. Hospital records showed that the four of them had collectively visited the hospital over 150 times for medical care before the age of five.

See also
List of murdered American children

References

External links
United We Stand Against Child Abuse
Uncovering Answers in Child's Death 
Cold Case Files - Through the Eyes of a Child; The Killer Next Door (transcript)

1957 births
1961 deaths
1961 in Illinois
1961 murders in the United States
Child abuse in the United States
Child abuse resulting in death
Deaths by beating in the United States
Deaths by person in Illinois
History of St. Clair County, Illinois
Murdered American children
People from St. Clair County, Illinois
People murdered in Illinois
Female murder victims
Incidents of violence against girls